Thomas Peter Usborne,  (born 1937) is a British publisher. In the early 1960s, Usborne co-founded the satirical magazine Private Eye. In 1973 he founded the children's book publisher Usborne Publishing. He studied at the University of Oxford and INSEAD business school in France.

Peter Usborne, founder and MD of Usborne, started working in children's books when he found out he was going to become a parent. Soon after, in 1973, he revolutionized the world of publishing for children by setting up his own company and pioneering a new generation of engaging, innovative, illustrated books for children, which combined popular subject matter with unrivalled quality in editorial and production.

Fifty years on, Peter still claims that parenthood has been the greatest privilege of his life, and that publishing children's books has been an extension of that. Now in his eighties, Peter still looks forward to coming to work every morning, and his roles as publisher and parent have never been more intertwined, as he now runs Usborne alongside his daughter Nicola Usborne, who is deputy MD.

Peter's son, Martin Usborne, runs his own publishing company: Hoxton Mini Press. The three Usbornes – Peter, Nicola and Martin – together run The Usborne Foundation, a charity founded by the Usborne family which harnesses research, design and technology to create playful media addressing issues from literacy to health. Teach Your Monster to Read is a series of games that's helped millions of children learn to read, funded by The Usborne Foundation.

His eponymous publishing company was named Children's Publisher of the Year at the British Book Awards in both 2012 and 2020, Independent Publisher of the Year at the Independent Publishing Awards in 2014, and Private Business of the Year in 2015.

Usborne's best-known booksinclude the Usborne Puzzle Adventure series (featuring Agent Arthur), the World of the Unknown series, the Book of the Future, Poppy and Sam's Farmyard Tales, Sticker Dolly Dressing and the THAT'S NOT MY® series of touchy-feely board books for babies by Fiona Watt (author).

Usborne was appointed Member of the Order of the British Empire (MBE) in 2011 for services to the publishing industry and Commander of the Order of the British Empire (CBE) in the 2022 New Year Honours for services to literature. He was awarded the London Book Fair Lifetime Achievement Award in 2015.

References

Living people
1937 births
British publishers (people)
Alumni of the University of Oxford
Commanders of the Order of the British Empire